Bruce Crossing is an unincorporated community in Ontonagon County in the U.S. state of Michigan. The community has a post office with the 49912 ZIP Code.

History 
Bruce Crossing was first settled by August Neuman, who built a sawmill at the location. The community was originally named Bruce's Crossing when its post office opened on March 5, 1888. The name came from the first postmaster, Donald M. Bruce, who owned a store at the crossing of the Duluth, South Shore and Atlantic Railway and the old Military Road. It was shortened to Bruce Crossing on August 13, 1891.

Weather 
July is typically the warmest month in Bruce Crossing, when highs average 77 °F (25 °C) and lows average 53 °F (12 °C). January is coldest, when the high temperatures average 19 °F (-7 °C) and the lows average -1 °F (-18 °C). The highest recorded temperature was 97 °F (36 °C) in 1975, and the lowest was -43 °F (−42 °C) in 1951.

Demographics

Images

References

Census-designated places in Ontonagon County, Michigan
Census-designated places in Michigan
Unincorporated communities in Ontonagon County, Michigan
Unincorporated communities in Michigan
Populated places established in 1888
1888 establishments in Michigan